The pilai is a type of Finnish bagpipe, described as "primitive", and as being similar to the Russian volynka.  A 1796 texts describes it as "the last of the Russian wind instruments" but noted it "appertains properly to the Finns".  The same text describes it as being made with a mouthpiece, two pipes, and an undressed goatskin.

A traveler named Matthew Guthrie wrote in 1795 (cited by the organologist Anthony Baines):

References

Finnish musical instruments
Bagpipes